Fruit Ridge (also known as The Ridge) is a topographical land feature and growing region in West Michigan. The area is so named for its extensive agricultural activity, specifically because of its fruit production.

Agriculture
It is considered to be an "agricultural mecca" as its unique features make it one of the prime fruit-growing regions in the world.

The Ridge is well known for apple production; in 2006 the area accounted for 65% of all Michigan apple production.

Geography
It extends from Walker in the south; to Grant in the North, and is primarily centered on Sparta; the location of the Old Orchard Juice Company. Fruit Ridge Avenue was named after it.

Renewable energy
In addition to agricultural practices, Fruit Ridge is also becoming an area of interest for the construction of commercial wind farms. Company officials hope to build 30 to 35 towers in the area. The Ridge is an area of interest because of the availability of straight line winds, existing high-voltage transmission lines, and farmers eager to preserve agriculture on the ridge. Heritage Sustainable Energy of Traverse City has also been securing wind rights leases in the Fruit Ridge Area. It is estimated that landowners will receive from $3,000 to $5,000 per year per megawatt.

Pesticide Environmental Stewardship Program
In 2005, International baby food manufacturer Gerber Products Company as well as Pacific Biocontrol, and Michigan State University all were working with area apple packers to develop a region-wide codling moth mating disruption program. This pest, which has been a major apple pest for many years, is developing documented resistance to the organophosphate insecticides.

References

External links
Fruit Ridge Center, USGS Topographic Map
Ridge Economic Agricultural Partners

West Michigan
Regions of Michigan
Geography of Michigan